is a Japanese electrical engineer, who played a significant role in the digital audio revolution. He received a degree in electrical engineering from the Tokyo Institute of Technology in 1964, and a PhD from Tohoku University in 1972.

He joined Sony Japan in 1964 and started the first digital audio project within Sony. He was the driving force behind the PCM adaptor, and was a prominent member of the Sony/Philips taskforce responsible for the design of the Compact Disc. He created, among others, the CIRC error correction system. He, with Kees Immink, refutes the myth that the Compact Disc's playing time was determined by Beethoven's Ninth Symphony.

He was the lead engineer of the DASH multi-track digital audio tape recorder. In the 1990s, he headed Sony's Digital Creatures Laboratory, where he was responsible for the Aibo, Sony's robotic dog. In 2003, Doi created the Qrio, a running humanoid robot.

Awards and honors
Fellowship, Audio Engineering Society
Eduard Rhein Prize, 1981
Silver Medal, Audio Engineering Society

References

External links
Toshitada Doi, Machine learning luminary - and AIBO's first master
Four Qrio’s perform various dance numbers

Japanese electrical engineers
Japanese inventors
Living people
1943 births
Tokyo Institute of Technology alumni
Tohoku University alumni